
Gmina Paradyż is a rural gmina (administrative district) in Opoczno County, Łódź Voivodeship, in central Poland.

Villages
Gmina Paradyż contains the villages and settlements of Adamów, Alfonsów, Bogusławy, Daleszewice, Dorobna Wola, Feliksów, Grzymałów, Honoratów, Irenów, Joaniów, Kazimierzów, Krasik, Mariampol, Paradyż, Podgaj, Popławy-Kolonia, Przyłęk, Solec, Stanisławów, Stawowice, Stawowice-Kolonia, Stawowiczki, Sylwerynów, Wielka Wola, Wójcin, Wójcin A and Wójcin B.

Neighbouring gminas
Gmina Paradyż is bordered by the gminas of Aleksandrów, Białaczów, Mniszków, Sławno and Żarnów.

References
Polish official population figures 2006

Paradyz
Opoczno County